Pitcairnia bulbosa, synonym Pepinia bulbosa, is a species of flowering plant in the family Bromeliaceae, native to Colombia and Venezuela. It was first described by Lyman Bradford Smith in 1955. In Colombia, it is found in  dry rich soil in crevices of granite rock.

References

Flora of Colombia
Flora of Venezuela
bulbosa
Plants described in 1955